Ashiyana is one of the major and one among the newest regions in Lucknow, the capital of the state Uttar Pradesh in India. It is connected to Alambagh on one side, Parag on another and extends up to Ruchi Khand. It is located in the southern part of Lucknow District.

Neighbourhoods in Lucknow